A flat-ten engine, also known as a horizontally opposed-ten, is a ten-cylinder piston engine with five cylinders on each side of a central crankshaft. 

There are no known flat-ten engines which reached production.

In the early 1960s, Chevrolet built several prototype flat-ten engines as part of an aborted program for family of Modular Engines to replace the Chevrolet Turbo-Air 6 flat-six engine. This development program investigated flat engines with between two and twelve cylinders, with the flat-ten version being known as "P-10" ("pancake" engine). Although the program was initially intended to develop an engine for the 1964 Chevrolet Corvair (which is rear-engined with rear-wheel drive), the flat-ten version was fitted to an experimental 1962 Chevrolet Impala (a front-engined car which was converted to front-wheel drive).

References

Piston engine configurations
10